BonziBuddy (stylized as BonziBUDDY) was a freeware desktop virtual assistant created by Joe and Jay Bonzi. Upon a user's choice, it would share jokes and facts, manage downloads, sing songs, and talk, among other functions, as it used Microsoft Agent.

BonziBuddy was described as spyware and adware, and discontinued in 2004 after the company behind it faced lawsuits regarding the software and was ordered to pay fines. Bonzi's website remained open after the discontinuation of BonziBuddy, but was shut down at the end of 2008.

Design
The software used Microsoft Agent technology similar to Office Assistant, and originally sported Peedy, a green parrot and one of the characters available with Microsoft Agent. Later versions of BonziBuddy in May 2000 featured its own character: Bonzi, a purple gorilla. The program also used a text-to-speech voice to interact with the user. The voice was called Sydney and taken from an old Lernout & Hauspie Microsoft Speech API 4.0 package. It is often referred to in some software as Adult Male #2.

A number of sources identify BonziBuddy as spyware, a claim the company disputed. In 2002, an article in Consumer Reports Web Watch labeled BonziBuddy as spyware, stating that it contains a backdoor trojan that collects information from users. The activities the program is said to engage in include constantly resetting the user's web browser homepage to bonzi.com without the user's permission, prompting and tracking various information about the user, installing a toolbar, and serving advertisements.

Trend Micro and Symantec have both classified the software as adware. Spyware Guides entry on the program also states that it is adware.

Reception
In April 2007, PC World readers voted BonziBuddy the sixth on a list named "The 20 Most Annoying Tech Products". One reader was quoted as criticizing the program because it "kept popping up and obscuring things you needed to see".

One of the last newspaper articles written about BonziBuddy while it was still in distribution described it as spyware and a "scourge of the Internet".  Another article found in 2006 on the BusinessWeek website described BonziBuddy as "the unbelievably annoying spyware trojan horse".

Lawsuits
Internetnews.com reported the settlement of a class action suit on 27 May 2003. Originally brought against Bonzi Software on 4 December 2002, the suit accused Bonzi of using its banner advertisements to deceptively imitate Windows computer alerts, alerting the user that their IP address is being broadcast. In the settlement, Bonzi Software agreed to modify their ads so that they looked less like Windows dialog boxes and more like actual advertisements.

On February 18, 2004, the Federal Trade Commission released a statement indicating that Bonzi Software, Inc. was ordered to pay US$75,000 in fees, among other aspects, for violating the Children's Online Privacy Protection Act by collecting personal information from children under the age of 13 with BonziBuddy.

See also

 Digital pet
 Prody Parrot
 Talking Moose

References

Computer-related introductions in 1999
Adware
Freeware
Spyware
Fictional gorillas
Products and services discontinued in 2004
Internet memes
Windows trojans
Human–computer interaction
Fictional singers